The United States census of 1980, conducted by the Census Bureau, determined the resident population of the United States to be 226,545,805, an increase of 11.4 percent over the 203,184,772 persons enumerated during the 1970 census. It was the first census in which a stateCaliforniarecorded a population of 20 million people, as well as the first in which all states recorded populations of over 400,000.

Census questions
The 1980 census collected the following information from all respondents:

 Address
 Name
 Household relationship
 Gender
 Race
 Age
 Marital status
 Whether of Spanish/Hispanic origin or descent

It was the first census not to ask for the name of the "head of household."

Approximately 16 percent of households received a "long form" of the 1980 census, which contained over 100 questions. Full documentation on the 1980 census, including census forms and a procedural history, is available from  the Integrated Public Use Microdata Series.

Data availability
Microdata from the 1980 census are freely available through the Integrated Public Use Microdata Series. Aggregate data for small areas, together with electronic boundary files, can be downloaded from the National Historical Geographic Information System. Personally identifiable information will be available in 2052.

State rankings

Between the 1980 census and the 1990 census, the United States population increased by approximately 22,164,837 or 9.8%.

City rankings

Politics

References

External links
Historic US Census data
1981 U.S Census Report Contains 1980 census results

Census
United States census
United States